William John Karlon (January 21, 1909 – December 7, 1964) was a Major League Baseball outfielder. In 2 career games, he had no hits in 5 at-bats. He batted and threw right-handed.

Karlon was born in Palmer, Massachusetts, and died in Ware, Massachusetts. Also known as "The Palmer Kid" and Hank Karlon. Married to Angelina (Mega) Karlon.

External links
Baseball Reference.com page

1909 births
1964 deaths
New York Yankees players
Major League Baseball outfielders
Baseball players from Massachusetts
People from Palmer, Massachusetts
People from Ware, Massachusetts